The 2019 Moldovan "B" Division was the 29th season of Moldovan football's third-tier league. The season started on 27 April 2019 and ended on 26 October 2019. The league consisted of three regional groups, Nord (North), Centru (Centre) and Sud (South).

North

Results 
The schedule consists of two rounds, each team plays each other once home-and-away for a total of 18 matches per team.

Centre

Results 
The schedule consists of two rounds, each team plays each other once home-and-away for a total of 18 matches per team.

South

Results 
The schedule consists of two rounds, each team plays each other once home-and-away for a total of 14 matches per team.

References

External links
 Divizia B - Results, fixtures, tables and news - Soccerway

Moldovan Liga 2 seasons
Moldova 3